Gemmula ambara is a species of sea snail, a marine gastropod mollusc in the family Turridae, the turrids.

Description
The length of the shell varies between 30 mm and 60 mm.

Distribution
This marine species occurs off the Philippines; Guadalcanal; Chilwei Island, East China Sea.

References

External links
  Baldomero M. Olivera, David R. Hillyard and Maren Watkins, A new species of Gemmula, Weinkauff 1875; Evidence of two clades of Philippine species in the genus Gemmula, Philippine Science letters, vol. 1 (1)
 Gastropods.com: Gemmula (Gemmula) ambara

ambara
Gastropods described in 2008